Abdul Wali al arkani() may refer to:

Khan Abdul Wali Khan (1917–2006), Pashtun activist against the British Raj, senior politician in Pakistan  and writer
Mohammad Abdul-Wali (1940–1973), Yemenite diplomat and writer
Abdiweli Sheikh Ahmed (born 1959), Somali economist, diplomat and politician
Abdiweli Mohamed Ali  (born 1965), Somali economist and politician
Abdul Wali (torture victim) (ca. 1975–2003), Afghan who died in US custody
Abduwali Muse (born ca. 1992), Somali accused of piracy
Abdilwali Hersi Abdille Indhaguran, Somali politician
Abdul-Wali al-Shameri, Yemeni diplomat
Abdul Wali or Omar Khalid Khorasani (–2022), Pakistani militant